Bülent Üçüncü (born 13 August 1974 in Istanbul) is a Turkish former professional footballer who played as an attacking midfielder. He also holds French citizenship.

Üçüncü retired from professional football in December 2005 at the age of 31, re-joining Stade Quimpérois in the French amateur-level Division d'Honneur. He had started his senior career at the club.

References

External links

1974 births
Living people
Footballers from Istanbul
Association football midfielders
Ligue 1 players
Ligue 2 players
Süper Lig players
Quimper Kerfeunteun F.C. players
FC Lorient players
Göztepe S.K. footballers
İstanbulspor footballers
Denizlispor footballers
Kayseri Erciyesspor footballers
Karşıyaka S.K. footballers
Akçaabat Sebatspor footballers
French people of Turkish descent
Expatriate footballers in France
Turkish expatriate sportspeople in France
Turkish expatriate footballers
Turkish footballers